Robert Henry "Bob" Gibson (5 August 1927 – March 1989) was an English footballer who scored 52 goals from 102 appearances in the Football League playing for Hull City, Lincoln City and Gateshead. He also played in the Scottish League for Aberdeen, and played non-league football in England for Ashington, Peterborough United, for whom he scored 51 goals in 55 Midland League appearances, and for Morpeth Town. He played as a centre forward.

References

1927 births
1989 deaths
Sportspeople from Ashington
Footballers from Northumberland
English footballers
Association football forwards
Ashington A.F.C. players
Aberdeen F.C. players
Hull City A.F.C. players
Lincoln City F.C. players
Peterborough United F.C. players
Gateshead A.F.C. players
Morpeth Town A.F.C. players
Scottish Football League players
English Football League players
Midland Football League players
Place of death missing